Dominique Chauvelier (born 3 August 1956) is a French former long-distance runner who competed in marathons. His greatest international achievement was a bronze medal in the marathon at the 1990 European Athletics Championships.

Born in La Flèche, he represented France at the 1992 Barcelona Olympics and was a five-time participant in the marathon at the World Championships in Athletics (1983, 1991, 1993, 1995, 1997). He also made four appearances in the marathon at the European Athletics Championships and seven appearances at the IAAF World Cross Country Championships. He led the French team to bronze medals at the 1989 World Marathon Cup and 1994 European Marathon Cup.

He was a four-time national champion in the marathon. He holds the French records for the 25,000 m and 30,000 m track events.

Among his wins on the professional circuit were the 1995 BIG 25 Berlin and the 1989 Reims Marathon. He is a five-time champion of the Marvejols-Mende Half Marathon and ran nine times at the New York City Marathon between 1992 and 2006 (his best result being 16th). As of 2016, he continues to compete as a masters category athlete.

Personal bests
5000 metres – 15:43.32 min (2007)
10,000 metres – 28:50.88 min (1985)
One hour run – 20,269 m (1989)
25,000 metres – 1:15:56.7 min (1992) 
30,000 metres – 1:31:53.2 min (1992) 
10K run – 	31:19 min (2000)
Half Marathon – 66:04 min (2001)
Marathon – 2:11:24 (1989)

All information taken from All-Athletics.

International competitions

National titles
French Athletics Championships
25K: 1990
Marathon: 1981, 1990, 1991, 1993

Circuit wins
Vignoble d'Alsace Marathon: 2005
BIG 25 Berlin: 1995
Val de Loire Marathon: 1995
Marvejols-Mende Half Marathon: 1993, 1990, 1989, 1984, 1981
Maroilles 20K: 1993
Foulées du Gois: 1990
Nice Marathon: 1990
Reims à Toutes Jambes: 1989
Lake Annecy Marathon: 1983
Helsinki Marathon: 1982

See also
List of marathon national champions (men)
List of European Athletics Championships medalists (men)
France at the 1992 Summer Olympics

References

External links

Living people
1956 births
People from La Flèche
French male long-distance runners
French male marathon runners
Olympic athletes of France
Athletes (track and field) at the 1992 Summer Olympics
World Athletics Championships athletes for France
European Athletics Championships medalists
Sportspeople from Sarthe